James Oliverio is an American composer of film scores and contemporary classical music.

Biography
Oliverio was born in Cleveland, Ohio.  He studied composition at the Cleveland Institute of Music.  Oliverio later moved to Atlanta, Georgia, where he was the composer-in-residence at the Georgia Institute of Technology.  His music for the film Time and Dreams was included in Atlanta's successful bid to host the 1996 Summer Olympics.  His piece The Explorer (later retitled To Boldly Go...) was commissioned and premiered as the opening for that summer's four-year Cultural Olympiad.  During the 1990s, Oliverio was described as "Atlanta's hottest composer".

Since January 2001, Oliverio has served as Executive Director of the Digital Worlds Institute at the University of Florida.

A lifelong friend of the timpanist brothers Paul and Mark Yancich, Oliverio has composed a number of works for the performers, including his first and second timpani concertos and the 2011 double timpani concerto Dynasty.

List of compositions
 The Fall of Babylon (1974) for mezzo-soprano and wind quintet
 Dantreume Leu Pliska (1975) for timpani and amplified double bass
 Etude for Four Harps (1975)
 Piano Sonata No. 1  (1976) for two pianos
 Aradia (1978) for acoustic and electronic chamber ensemble
 J'ai Plus de Souvenirs (1978) for soprano and amplified double bass quintet
 Go Gently, My Friend (1986) for symphony orchestra
 American Suite (1988) for symphony orchestra
 Anniversary Overture (1988) for symphony orchestra
 Drawn to the Light (1989) for chorus and orchestra
 Timpani Concerto No. 1: The Olympian (1990) for timpani and orchestra
 Winds of the Magic Wood (1990) for woodwind quintet and narrator
 Concerto for Orchestra (1990)
 The Story of Snow White: A Child's Introduction to the Symphony Orchestra, Second Edition (1991)
 Voyage Through the Musical Universe (1991) for orchestra and narrator
 Songs Without Words (1992) for chamber ensemble
 The Lessons of Time (1992) for chorus and orchestra
 Imaginary Worlds (1992) chamber ensemble with electronics
 Common Ground (1992) ballet for orchestra
 Pilgrimage: Concerto for Brass (1992) for orchestra and brass soloists
 Children of a Common Mother (1992) for four ethnic storytellers and multicultural percussion orchestra
 To Boldly Go... (The Explorer) (1992) for orchestra
 Dark Serenade (1994) for piano, cello, and orchestra
 The Science of Imagination (1995) for orchestra and large-scale digital media
 Three Scenes for Flute and Orchestra (1995)
 StarChild: the Opera (1996) opera for live performers and large-scale digital media
 Timpani Concerto No. 1 (1996) for timpani and symphonic winds
 A Thousand Lifetimes (1997) for five singers and orchestra
 DRUMMA (1998) for large percussion ensemble and timpani soloist
 Dreamers, Then Remembering, Open the Sky (1998) for MIDI percussion soloists and symphonic band
 Generations (2000) for chorus and orchestra
 The Messenger (2001) for percussion, orchestra, and digital media
 Hands Across the Ocean (2004) for distributed performance ensemble and online interactive virtual environment
 In Common: Time (2005) for distributed performance ensemble and online interactive virtual environment
 DRUMMA v2.0 (2006) for distributed percussion ensemble and interactive virtual environment
 Timpani Concerto No. 2 (2007) for timpani and orchestra
 SMOKE|WIRE|ROCK (2007)
 Voyage to Tomorrow (2008) for chorus, orchestra, and digital media
 Little Tricker the Squirrel Meets Big Double the Bear (2008) ballet
 Dynasty (2011) Concerto for two timpanists and orchestra

References

External links

Official website

Living people
American male composers
21st-century American composers
Musicians from Cleveland
Year of birth missing (living people)
Cleveland Institute of Music alumni
Musicians from Atlanta
21st-century American male musicians
University of Florida faculty